The 2012 Nebraska Danger season was the second season for the Nebraska Danger as a professional indoor football franchise and their second in the Indoor Football League (IFL). One of 16 teams competing in the IFL for the 2012 season, the Nebraska Danger were members of the Intense Conference.

The team played their home games under head coach Mike Davis at the Eihusen Arena in Grand Island, Nebraska. The Danger earned a 5–9 record, placing 6th in the Intense Conference, and failed to qualify for post-season play.

Schedule
Key:

Preseason

Regular season
All start times are local

Roster

Standings

References

External links
 Nebraska Danger official website

Nebraska Danger
Nebraska Danger
Nebraska Danger